Akivasha is a female character appearing in the fictional universe of Robert E. Howard's Conan the Barbarian.

Fictional character biography

Etymology 
Akivasha's name is derived from the Egyptian name (Akkaiwasha) for the Achaeans.

Origin 
She was Stygian princess more than 10000 years before Conan.

Appearance 
 Hour of the Dragon
 
Her first appearance at The Hour of the Dragon from Weird Tales (1935-1936).

 Kull The Conqueror

The novelization of the film Kull the Conqueror, written by Sean A. Moore, published by Tor Books.
 Return of Akivasha

The Return of Akivasha: Book One of the Lost Hyborian Tales, written by Timothy Ford Allen

Appearances in other media

Film 
 Kull the Conqueror - the 1997 film is based on The Hour of the Dragon, replacing Conan with Kull and Xaltotun with Akivasha. The character of Akivasha was played by Tia Carrere.

Video games 
In Age of Conan: Unchained, she is a boss in location "Sanctum of the Burning Souls".

Comics 
 Conan the Cimmerian #15 - The Sorrow of Akivasha by Dark Horse Comics, 2009.
 King Conan: The Conqueror#4 by Dark Horse Comics, 2014.
 Savage Sword of Conan#10 by Marvel, 1976.

Role-playing game 
 Dungeons & Dragons Conan Against Darkness!

Further reading 
 The Hyborian Heresies, 2004 г., 9781411616080
 Encyclopedia of the Vampire: The Living Dead in Myth, Legend, and Popular Culture, S. T. Joshi,  ABC-CLIO, 2011, 9780313378331
 The Robert E. Howard Reader, Milford series: Popular writers of today (Том 71), Darrell Schweitzer, Wildside Press LLC, 2010 г., 9781434411655
 Conan The Swordsman, L. Sprague de Camp, Lin Carter, Bjorn Nyberg, Macmillan, 2002, 9781466834972

References

External links 
 Akivasha on Marvunapp.com
 Akivasha on Imdb.com
 Akivasha on Comicvine.com 
 Akivasha at  Comicbookdb.com 
 Mystery of Pre-human Stygia

Fictional princesses
Fictional vampires
Robert E. Howard characters
Characters in pulp fiction
Literary characters introduced in 1936
Dark Horse Comics vampires
Fantasy film characters
Marvel Comics vampires
Video game bosses
Female characters in literature